Downunder: Live in Australia is a live album by Scottish folk musician Bert Jansch, released in January 2001. The concert was recorded over two nights at the Continental Café in Melbourne, Australia.

Bearing only a slight overlap with Jansch's previous live album Live at the 12 Bar in content, this was recorded on multi-track rather than straight-to-DAT, with consequently smoother sound and the rare bonus of accompanying musicians. The percussionist was added on after the gig recordings at a studio in Australia, and Jansch mixed the tracks in London.

Track listing
All tracks composed by Bert Jansch; except where indicated

"Blues Run the Game" (Jackson C. Frank) - 3:08
"Come Back Baby" (Walter Davis) - 3:34
"The Lily of the West" (Traditional) - 4:14
"Paper Houses" - 3:09
"Toy Balloon" - 3:59
"My Donald" (Owen Hand) - 2:57
"Born and Bred in Old Ireland" - 3:04
"She Moved Through the Fair" (Traditional) - 5:22
"Carnival" (Jackson C. Frank) - 4:31
"Little Max" - 3:25
"Strolling Down the Highway" - 3:19
"Angie" (Nat Adderley, Davey Graham) - 3:50
"Curragh of Kildare" (Traditional) - 4:20
"Downunder" - 4:59
"How It All Came Down" - 4:13

Personnel
Bert Jansch - guitar, vocals
Peter Howell - bass (not the Doctor Who Peter Howell - This is the Australian one!)
Ian Clarke - percussion (not the Uriah Heep Ian Clarke - This is the Australian one!)

References

Bert Jansch albums
2001 live albums